Gaoyou Lake is the sixth largest freshwater lake in China, it is located between Anhui Province and Jiangsu Province. In a sense Gaoyou Lake is a manmade lake, and its creation is part of a long story about flood control and hydraulic engineering in ancient China. Gaoyou Lake is now part of the Huai River system as the Huai River flows south through Gaoyou Lake on its way to the Yangtze River and the Pacific.

See also
 1931 China floods
 Gaoyou
 Grand Canal (China)

Notes

Lakes of Jiangsu
Lakes of Anhui
Huai River